Steve Barnes may refer to:

Steve Barnes (actor) (born 1967), American actor, radio personality, and media executive
Steve Barnes (basketball) (born 1957), American men's college basketball coach
Steve Barnes (footballer) (born 1976), English former professional footballer
Steve Barnes (ice hockey) (born 1970), Canadian ice hockey player
Steven Barnes (born 1952), American science fiction writer, lecturer, and human performance technician
Steve Barnes (attorney) (1959–2020), American lawyer and founding partner at Cellino and Barnes